Macropodidae is a family of marsupials that includes kangaroos, wallabies, tree-kangaroos, wallaroos, pademelons, quokkas, and several other groups. These genera are allied to the suborder Macropodiformes, containing other macropods, and are native to the Australian continent (the mainland and Tasmania), New Guinea and nearby islands.

Description

Although omnivorous kangaroos lived in the past, modern macropods are herbivorous. Some are browsers, but most are grazers and are equipped with appropriately specialised teeth for cropping and grinding up fibrous plants, in particular grasses and sedges. In general, macropods have a broad, straight row of cutting teeth at the front of the mouth, no canine teeth, and a gap before the molars. The molars are large and, unusually, do not appear all at once but a pair at a time at the back of the mouth as the animal ages, eventually becoming worn down by the tough, abrasive grasses and falling out. Like many Macropodiformes, early kangaroos had plagiaulacoids, but these converted into normal molars in more derived species. Most species have four molars and, when the last pair is too worn to be of use, the animals starve to death.

Like the eutherian ruminants of the Northern Hemisphere (sheep, cattle, and so on), macropods have specialised digestive systems that use a high concentration of bacteria, protozoans, and fungi in the first chamber of a complex stomach to digest plant material. The details of organisation are quite different, but the end result is somewhat similar.

The particular structure-function relationship of the Macropodidae gut and the gut microbiota allows the degradation of lignocellulosic material with a relatively low emission of methane relative to other ruminants. These low emissions are partly explained by the anatomical differences between the macropodid digestive system and that of ruminants, resulting in shorter retention times of particulate digesta within the foregut. This fact might prevent the establishment of methanogenic archaea, which has been found in low levels in tammar wallabies (Notamacropus eugenii) and eastern grey kangaroo (M. giganteus). Metagenomic analysis revealed that the foregut of tammar wallabies mainly contains bacteria belonging to the phyla Bacillota, Bacteroidota, and Pseudomonadota. Among Pseudomonadota populations of the Succinivibrionaceae family are overrepresented and may contribute to low methane emissions.

Macropods vary in size considerably, but most have very large hind legs and long, powerfully muscled tails. The term macropod comes from the Greek for "large foot" and is appropriate: most have very long, narrow hind feet with a distinctive arrangement of toes. The fourth toe is very large and strong, the fifth toe moderately so; the second and third are fused; and the first toe is usually missing. Their short front legs have five separate digits. Some macropods have seven carpal bones instead of the usual eight in mammals. All have relatively small heads and most have large ears, except for tree-kangaroos, which must move quickly between closely spaced branches. The young are born very small and the pouch opens forward.

The unusual development of the hind legs is optimised for economical long-distance travel at fairly high speed. The greatly elongated feet provide enormous leverage for the strong legs, but the famous kangaroo hop has more: kangaroos and wallabies have a unique ability to store elastic strain energy in their tendons. In consequence, most of the energy required for each hop is provided "free" by the spring action of the tendons (rather than by muscular effort). The main limitation on a macropod's ability to leap is not the strength of the muscles in the hindquarters, it is the ability of the joints and tendons to withstand the strain of hopping.

In addition, the hopping action is linked to breathing. As the feet leave the ground, air is expelled from the lungs by what amounts to an internal piston; bringing the feet forward ready for landing fills the lungs again, providing further energy efficiency. Studies of kangaroos and wallabies have demonstrated that, beyond the minimum energy expenditure required to hop at all, increased speed requires very little extra effort (much less than the same speed increase in, say, a horse, a dog, or a human), and also that little extra energy is required to carry extra weight – something that is of obvious importance to females carrying large pouch young.

The ability of larger macropods to survive on poor-quality, low-energy feed, and to travel long distances at high speed without great energy expenditure (to reach fresh food supplies or waterholes, and to escape predators) has been crucial to their evolutionary success on a continent that, because of poor soil fertility and low, unpredictable average rainfall, offers only very limited primary plant productivity.

Gestation in macropods lasts about a month, being slightly longer in the largest species. They soon attach themselves to one of four teats inside the mother's pouch. The young leave the pouch after five to 11 months, and are weaned after a further two to six months. Macropods reach sexual maturity at one to three years of age, depending on the species.

Fossil record

thumb | Procoptodon goliah 
 thumb |Simosthenurus occidentalis
thumb |Sthenurus strilingi

The evolutionary ancestors of marsupials split from placental mammals during the Jurassic period about 160 million years ago (Mya). The earliest known fossil macropod dates back about 11.61 to 28.4 Mya, either in the Miocene or Late Oligocene, and was uncovered in South Australia. Unfortunately, the fossil could not be identified any further than the family. A Queensland fossil of a species similar to Hadronomas has been dated at around 5.33 to 11.61 Mya, falling in the Late Miocene or Early Pliocene. The earliest completely identifiable fossils are from around 5.33 Mya.

Classification

The listing for extant species is based on The Third edition of Wilson & Reeder's Mammal Species of the World (2005), except where the Mammal Diversity Database and IUCN agree on a change. The two living subfamilies in the family Macropodidae are the Lagostrophinae, represented by a single species, the banded hare-wallaby, and the remainder, which make up the subfamily Macropodinae (67 species).

 Macropodidae
 Genus †Watutia
 Genus †Dorcopsoides
 Genus †Kurrabi
 Subfamily Lagostrophinae
 Genus Lagostrophus
 Banded hare-wallaby, Lagostrophus fasciatus
 Genus †Protemnodon
 Genus †Nombe
 Genus †Troposodon
 Subfamily Sthenurinae
 Genus Hadronomas
 Tribe Sthenurini
 Genus Sthenurus
 Genus Metasthenurus
 Tribe Simosthenurini
 Genus Archaeosimos
 Genus Simosthenurus
 Genus Procoptodon
 Subfamily Macropodinae
 Genus †Prionotemnus
 Genus †Congruus
 Genus †Baringa
 Genus †Bohra
 Genus †Synaptodon
 Genus †Fissuridon
 Genus †Silvaroo
 Genus Dendrolagus: tree-kangaroos
 Grizzled tree-kangaroo, Dendrolagus inustus
 Lumholtz's tree-kangaroo, Dendrolagus lumholtzi
 Bennett's tree-kangaroo, Dendrolagus bennettianus
 Ursine tree-kangaroo, Dendrolagus ursinus
 Matschie's tree-kangaroo, Dendrolagus matschiei
 Doria's tree-kangaroo, Dendrolagus dorianus
 Goodfellow's tree-kangaroo, Dendrolagus goodfellowi
 Lowlands tree-kangaroo, Dendrolagus spadix
 Golden-mantled tree-kangaroo, Dendrolagus pulcherrimus
 Seri's tree-kangaroo, Dendrolagus stellarum
 Dingiso, Dendrolagus mbaiso
 Tenkile, Dendrolagus scottae
 Wondiwoi tree-kangaroo, Dendrolagus mayri
 Ifola, Dendrolagus notatus
 Genus Dorcopsis
 Brown dorcopsis, Dorcopsis muelleri
 White-striped dorcopsis, Dorcopsis hageni
 Black dorcopsis, Dorcopsis atrata
 Gray dorcopsis, Dorcopsis luctuosa
 Genus Dorcopsulus
 Small dorcopsis, Dorcopsulus vanheurni
 Macleay's dorcopsis, Dorcopsulus macleayi
 Genus Lagorchestes
 †Lake Mackay hare-wallaby, Lagorchestes asomatus
 Spectacled hare-wallaby, Lagorchestes conspicillatus
 Rufous hare-wallaby, Lagorchestes hirsutus
 †Eastern hare-wallaby, Lagorchestes leporides
 Genus Macropus
 Western grey kangaroo, Macropus fuliginosus
 Eastern grey kangaroo, Macropus giganteus
 Genus Notamacropus
 Agile wallaby, Notamacropus agilis
 Black-striped wallaby, Notamacropus dorsalis
 Tammar wallaby, Notamacropus eugenii
 Western brush wallaby, Notamacropus irma
 Parma wallaby, Notamacropus parma 
 Pretty-faced wallaby, Notamacropus parryi
 Red-necked wallaby, Notamacropus rufogriseus
 †Toolache wallaby, Notamacropus greyi
 Genus Onychogalea
 Bridled nail-tail wallaby, Onychogalea fraenata
 †Crescent nail-tail wallaby, Onychogalea lunata
 Northern nail-tail wallaby, Onychogalea unguifera
 Genus Osphranter
 Antilopine kangaroo, Osphranter antilopinus
 Black wallaroo, Osphranter bernardus
 Common wallaroo, Osphranter robustus
 Red kangaroo, Osphranter rufus
 Genus Petrogale
 P. brachyotis species-group
 Short-eared rock-wallaby, Petrogale brachyotis
 Monjon, Petrogale burbidgei
 Nabarlek, Petrogale concinna
 P. xanthopus species-group
 Proserpine rock-wallaby, Petrogale persephone
 Rothschild's rock-wallaby, Petrogale rothschildi
 Yellow-footed rock-wallaby, Petrogale xanthopus
 P. lateralis/penicillata species-group
 Allied rock-wallaby, Petrogale assimilis
 Cape York rock-wallaby, Petrogale coenensis
 Godman's rock-wallaby, Petrogale godmani
 Herbert's rock-wallaby, Petrogale herberti
 Unadorned rock-wallaby, Petrogale inornata
 Black-flanked rock-wallaby, Petrogale lateralis
 Mareeba rock-wallaby, Petrogale mareeba
 Brush-tailed rock-wallaby, Petrogale penicillata
 Purple-necked rock-wallaby, Petrogale purpureicollis
 Mount Claro rock-wallaby, Petrogale sharmani
 Genus Setonix
 Quokka or short-tailed scrub wallaby, Setonix brachyurus
 Genus Thylogale
 Tasmanian pademelon, Thylogale billardierii
 Brown's pademelon, Thylogale browni
 Dusky pademelon, Thylogale brunii
 Calaby's pademelon, Thylogale calabyi
 Mountain pademelon, Thylogale lanatus
 Red-legged pademelon, Thylogale stigmatica
 Red-necked pademelon, Thylogale thetis
 Genus Wallabia
 Swamp wallaby or black wallaby, W. bicolor

See also

 Australian megafauna
 Macropod hybrid

References

External links
 
 
 
 

 
Marsupials of Australia
Extant Chattian first appearances
Mammal families
Taxa named by John Edward Gray